Nitric oxide (nitrogen oxide or nitrogen monoxide) is a colorless gas with the formula .  It is one of the principal oxides of nitrogen. Nitric oxide is a free radical: it has an unpaired electron, which is sometimes denoted by a dot in its chemical formula (•N=O or •NO).  Nitric oxide is also a heteronuclear diatomic molecule, a class of molecules whose study spawned early modern theories of chemical bonding.

An important intermediate in industrial chemistry, nitric oxide forms in combustion systems and can be generated by lightning in thunderstorms. In mammals, including humans, nitric oxide is a signaling molecule in many physiological and pathological processes.  It was proclaimed the "Molecule of the Year" in 1992.  The 1998 Nobel Prize in Physiology or Medicine was awarded for discovering nitric oxide's role as a cardiovascular signalling molecule.

Nitric oxide should not be confused with nitrogen dioxide (NO2), a brown gas and major air pollutant, or with nitrous oxide (N2O), an anesthetic gas.

Reactions

With di- and triatomic molecules
Upon condensing to a liquid, nitric oxide dimerizes to dinitrogen dioxide, but the association is weak and reversible.  The N–N distance in crystalline NO is 218 pm, nearly twice the N–O distance.

Since the heat of formation of •NO is endothermic, NO can be decomposed to the elements.  Catalytic converters in cars exploit this reaction:
 2 NO  →  O2 +  N2

When exposed to oxygen, nitric oxide converts into nitrogen dioxide:
 2 NO + O2 → 2 NO2

This reaction is thought to occur via the intermediates ONOO• and the red compound ONOONO.

In water, nitric oxide reacts with oxygen to form nitrous acid (HNO2). The reaction is thought to proceed via the following stoichiometry:

 4 NO + O2 + 2 H2O → 4 HNO2

Nitric oxide reacts with fluorine, chlorine, and bromine to form the nitrosyl halides, such as nitrosyl chloride:
 2 NO + Cl2 → 2 NOCl

With NO2, also a radical, NO combines to form the intensely blue dinitrogen trioxide:
 NO + NO2  ON−NO2

Organic chemistry
The addition of a nitric oxide moiety to another molecule is often referred to as nitrosylation. The Traube reaction is the addition of a two equivalents of nitric oxide onto an enolate, giving a diazeniumdiolate (also called a nitrosohydroxylamine). The product can undergo a subsequent retro-aldol reaction, giving an overall process similar to the haloform reaction. For example, nitric oxide reacts with acetone and an alkoxide to form a diazeniumdiolate on each α position, with subsequent loss of methyl acetate as a by-product:

 

This reaction, which was discovered around 1898, remains of interest in nitric oxide prodrug research. Nitric oxide can also react directly with sodium methoxide, ultimately forming sodium formate and nitrous oxide by way of an N-methoxydiazeniumdiolate.

Coordination complexes

Nitric oxide reacts with transition metals to give complexes called metal nitrosyls. The most common bonding mode of nitric oxide is the terminal linear type (M−NO). Alternatively, nitric oxide can serve as a one-electron pseudohalide. In such complexes, the M−N−O group is characterized by an angle between 120° and 140°.  The NO group can also bridge between metal centers through the nitrogen atom in a variety of geometries.

Production and preparation
In commercial settings, nitric oxide is produced by the oxidation of ammonia at 750–900 °C (normally at 850 °C) with platinum as catalyst in the Ostwald process:

4 NH3 + 5 O2 → 4 NO + 6 H2O

The uncatalyzed endothermic reaction of oxygen (O2) and nitrogen (N2), which is effected at high temperature (>2000 °C) by lightning has not been developed into a practical commercial synthesis (see Birkeland–Eyde process):
N2 + O2 → 2 NO

Laboratory methods
In the laboratory, nitric oxide is conveniently generated by reduction of dilute nitric acid with copper:
8 HNO3 + 3 Cu → 3 Cu(NO3)2 + 4 H2O + 2 NO

An alternative route involves the reduction of nitrous acid in the form of sodium nitrite or potassium nitrite:
 2 NaNO2 + 2 NaI + 2 H2SO4 → I2 + 2 Na2SO4 + 2 H2O + 2 NO
 2 NaNO2 + 2 FeSO4 + 3 H2SO4 → Fe2(SO4)3 + 2 NaHSO4 + 2 H2O + 2 NO
 3 KNO2 + KNO3 + Cr2O3 → 2 K2CrO4 + 4 NO

The iron(II) sulfate route is simple and has been used in undergraduate laboratory experiments. So-called NONOate compounds are also used for nitric oxide generation.

Detection and assay

Nitric oxide concentration can be determined using a chemiluminescent reaction involving ozone. A sample containing nitric oxide is mixed with a large quantity of ozone. The nitric oxide reacts with the ozone to produce oxygen and nitrogen dioxide, accompanied with emission of light (chemiluminescence):
 NO + O3 → NO2 + O2 + hν
which can be measured with a photodetector. The amount of light produced is proportional to the amount of nitric oxide in the sample.

Other methods of testing include electroanalysis (amperometric approach), where ·NO reacts with an electrode to induce a current or voltage change. The detection of NO radicals in biological tissues is particularly difficult due to the short lifetime and concentration of these radicals in tissues. One of the few practical methods is spin trapping of nitric oxide with iron-dithiocarbamate complexes and subsequent detection of the mono-nitrosyl-iron complex with electron paramagnetic resonance (EPR).

A group of fluorescent dye indicators that are also available in acetylated form for intracellular measurements exist. The most common compound is 4,5-diaminofluorescein (DAF-2).

Environmental effects

Acid rain deposition 
Nitric oxide reacts with the hydroperoxyl radical to form nitrogen dioxide (NO2), which then can react with a hydroxyl radical (•OH) to produce nitric acid (HNO3):
 •NO +  → •NO2 + •OH
 •NO2 +  •OH → HNO3
Nitric acid, along with sulfuric acid, contributes to acid rain deposition.

Ozone depletion 
•NO participates in ozone layer depletion. Nitric oxide reacts with stratospheric ozone to form O2 and nitrogen dioxide:
 •NO + O3 → NO2 + O2

This reaction is also utilized to measure concentrations  of •NO in control volumes.

Precursor to NO2 
As seen in the acid deposition section, nitric oxide can transform into nitrogen dioxide (this can happen with the hydroperoxy radical, or diatomic oxygen, O2). Symptoms of short-term nitrogen dioxide exposure include nausea, dyspnea and headache. Long-term effects could include impaired immune and respiratory function.

Biological functions

NO is a gaseous signaling molecule. It is a key vertebrate biological messenger, playing a role in a variety of biological processes. It is a bioproduct in almost all types of organisms, including bacteria, plants, fungi, and animal cells.

Nitric oxide, an endothelium-derived relaxing factor (EDRF), is biosynthesized endogenously from L-arginine, oxygen, and NADPH by various nitric oxide synthase (NOS) enzymes. Reduction of inorganic nitrate may also make nitric oxide. One of the main enzymatic targets of nitric oxide is guanylyl cyclase. The binding of nitric oxide to the heme region of the enzyme leads to activation, in the presence of iron. Nitric oxide is highly reactive (having a lifetime of a few seconds), yet diffuses freely across membranes. These attributes make nitric oxide ideal for a transient paracrine (between adjacent cells) and autocrine (within a single cell) signaling molecule. Once nitric oxide is converted to nitrates and nitrites by oxygen and water, cell signaling is deactivated.

The endothelium (inner lining) of blood vessels uses nitric oxide to signal the surrounding smooth muscle to relax, resulting in vasodilation and increasing blood flow. Sildenafil (Viagra) is a drug that uses the nitric oxide pathway. Sildenafil does not produce nitric oxide, but enhances the signals that are downstream of the nitric oxide pathway by protecting cyclic guanosine monophosphate (cGMP) from degradation by cGMP-specific phosphodiesterase type 5 (PDE5) in the corpus cavernosum, allowing for the signal to be enhanced, and thus vasodilation. Another endogenous gaseous transmitter, hydrogen sulfide (H2S) works with NO to induce vasodilation and angiogenesis in a cooperative manner.

Nasal breathing produces nitric oxide within the body, while oral breathing does not.

Occupational safety and health 
In the U.S., the Occupational Safety and Health Administration (OSHA) has set the legal limit (permissible exposure limit) for nitric oxide exposure in the workplace as 25 ppm (30 mg/m3) over an 8-hour workday. The National Institute for Occupational Safety and Health (NIOSH) has set a recommended exposure limit (REL) of 25 ppm (30 mg/m3) over an 8-hour workday. At levels of 100 ppm, nitric oxide is immediately dangerous to life and health.

Explosion hazard 
Liquid nitrogen oxide is very sensitive to detonation even in the absence of fuel, and can be initiated as readily as nitroglycerin. Detonation of the endothermic liquid oxide close to its b.p. (-152°C) generated a 100 kbar pulse and fragmented the test equipment. It is the simplest molecule that is capable of detonation in all three phases. The liquid oxide is sensitive and may explode during distillation, and this has been the cause of industrial accidents. Gaseous nitric oxide detonates at about 2300 m/s, but as a solid it can reach a detonation velocity of 6100 m/s.

References
Notes 

Further reading
 Butler A. and Nicholson R.; "Life, death and NO." Cambridge 2003. .
 van Faassen, E. E.; Vanin, A. F. (eds); "Radicals for life: The various forms of Nitric Oxide." Elsevier, Amsterdam 2007. .
 Ignarro, L. J. (ed.); "Nitric oxide:biology and pathobiology." Academic Press, San Diego 2000. .

External links
 International Chemical Safety Card 1311
 
 Microscale Gas Chemistry: Experiments with Nitrogen Oxides
 Your Brain Boots Up Like a Computer – new insights about the biological role of nitric oxide.
 Assessing The Potential of Nitric Oxide in the Diabetic Foot
 New Discoveries About Nitric Oxide Can Provide Drugs For Schizophrenia
 Nitric Oxide at the Chemical Database
 

Free radicals
Gaseous signaling molecules
GABAA receptor positive allosteric modulators
Nitrogen oxides
Neurotransmitters
Nitrogen cycle
NMDA receptor antagonists
Orphan drugs
Diatomic molecules